Boesky is a surname. Notable people with the surname include:

 Amy Boesky, American author and professor
 Ivan Boesky (born 1937), American stock trader